Robert Knapp may refer to:
Robert D. Knapp (1897–1994), U.S. Air Force aviator and general
Robert M. Knapp (1831–1889), congressman from Illinois
Robert Knapp (actor) (1924–2001), American actor
Robert Knapp (classicist), professor of classics at the University of California, Berkeley